The  was held on 5 February 2021. Because of the COVID-19 pandemic, the physical awards ceremony was cancelled and an official pamphlet was released on 5 February 2021. The winners had been notified on 5 December 2020, and given their prizes individually.

Awards
 Best Film: - Labyrinth of Cinema 
 Best Director: Hideo Jojo -  and Dangerous Drugs of Sex
 Yoshimitsu Morita Memorial Best New Director: Takuya Uchiyama - 
 Best Screenplay:  - A Beloved Wife and Underdog Parts 1 and 2
 Best Cinematographer:  -  and 
 Best Actor: Kazunari Ninomiya - The Asadas
 Best Actress: Asami Mizukawa - A Beloved Wife and Runway
 Best Supporting Actor: 
  - The Voice of Sin and The Real Thing
 Naoto Ogata -  Best Supporting Actress: Aju Makita - True Mothers and  Best Newcomer:
 Nana Mori - Last Letter, 461 Days of Bento: A Promise Between Father and Son, and   -  and His Hio Miyazawa - His Sakurako Konishi - First Love, and  Examiner Special Award::  -  Special Grand Prize: Nobuhiko Obayashi and Kyoko Obayashi  - Labyrinth of CinemaTop 10
 Labyrinth of Cinema A Beloved Wife The Asadas True Mothers Wife of a Spy  The Voice of Sin The Real Thing  runner-up. 37 Seconds''

References

Yokohama Film Festival
Yokohama Film Festival
2021 in Japanese cinema
2020 film awards